Madhu Varma Mantena is an Indian film producer and entrepreneur involved in the production and distribution of films across Hindi, Telugu, and Bengali cinema.

Film career
In 2008, Madhu Mantena co-produced Ghajini (2008) which was the highest grossing Indian film for that year. Since then Madhu has produced films such as the trilingual sleeper-hit Rakht Charitra (2010), the political thriller Rann (2010) screened at the Toronto International Film Festival, and the Bengali hit Autograph.

Madhu co-founded Phantom Films with Anurag Kashyap, Vikas Bahl and Vikramaditya Motwane, which went on to deliver works such as Lootera (2013), Queen (2014) which won the National Film Award for Best Feature Film in Hindi for that year, Hasee Toh Phasee (2014), and the Neo-Noir films, Bombay Velvet (2015), Ugly (2015) screened in the Directors' Fortnight section at the 2013 Cannes Film Festival, and the New York Indian Film Festival, and Masaan screened in the Un Certain Regard section at the 2015 Cannes Film Festival winning two awards, and the National Film Award. The 2016 film Raman Raghav 2.0 was screened at the Cannes Directors' Fortnight.
He made it into the Limca Book of Records for theatrically releasing seven films, produced by him, within a time span of 50 days. This is the maximum number of release in different languages by one producer in the shortest time. Four of the films were released within a short span of eight days. He also ran Ram Gopal Varma's production house Factory. His film for 2019 is Super 30

Non-film works
Madhu Mantena began his career by creating his own music label as a teenager which he then sold to Supreme Recording Company. He then went on to set up Adlabs’ International Operations under the aegis of Manmohan Shetty and was head of Saregama Films. Currently, Madhu Mantena has built a media entity with various companies operating across the entertainment and media value chain, each specializing in one of the fields of talent management, content development, content production, content distribution and monetization.

He Co-founded KWAN, a celebrity management company, with Anirban Das Blah (erstwhile CEO of Globosport). In 2012 KWAN announced a joint venture along-with Creative Artist Agency (CAA) to form a new entity, CAA KWAN. This talent management agency presently commands a variety of business interests and manages a repertoire of Indian talent as well as international talent.

Filmography
As Producer

Awards

External links 
 Madhu Mantena IMDB
 Official Website

References

Film producers from Hyderabad, India
Filmfare Awards winners
Living people
Bengali film producers
Telugu film producers
1975 births